Central Ayrshire is a constituency of the British House of Commons, located in the south-west of Scotland within the North Ayrshire and South Ayrshire council areas. It elects one Member of Parliament (MP) at least once every five years using the first-past-the-post system of voting.

Boundaries 

As created in 1950, the constituency merged parts of the Bute and Northern Ayrshire and Kilmarnock constituencies. Following the Representation of the People Act 1948, the Central Ayrshire constituency between 1950 and 1955 consisted of Irvine, Kilwinning, Stewarton, Troon, Kilbirnie and part of the district of Kilmarnock. When abolished in 1983, the constituency was largely replaced by Cunninghame South, with Troon and its surrounding areas forming part of the Ayr constituency.

The constituency was re-established in 2005, centred around the historic burgh of Irvine and stretching north to cover part of Kilwinning and south to cover the coastal resort towns of Prestwick, Troon and their adjacent hinterlands alongside part of Ayr. The constituency covers the 2017 electoral wards of Irvine East, Irvine South, Irvine West and a small section of Kilwinning (between the River Garnock and the B778) from the North Ayrshire Council area and Prestwick, Troon, Kyle and a small section of Ayr North (between Seaforth Road and Lochside Road in Heathfield) from the South Ayrshire Council area. The remainder of the North Ayrshire Council area is represented as part of the North Ayrshire and Arran Parliamentary constituency, with the remainder of South Ayrshire being covered by the Ayr, Carrick and Cumnock Parliamentary constituency alongside parts of East Ayrshire.

Constituency profile

Constituency 
The constituency covers towns such as Irvine and parts of Kilwinning to the north, as well as the coastal resorts of Troon and Prestwick to the south. The seat also takes in a set of villages in rural South Ayrshire including the former mining communities of Annbank, Mossblown and Tarbolton alongside the villages of Loans, Dundonald and Symington.

Irvine was designated in the 1970s as a Glasgow overspill new town. In recent local council elections, the SNP have performed strongly in the town of Irvine gaining 3 Councillors to Labours 5 in Irvine and Kilwinning wards.

The coastal towns of Prestwick and Troon join the town as part of the constituency as well as outlying rural areas located south and east of Troon and Prestwick: Prestwick, Troon and their hinterlands have sustained a considerable level of support for Conservative candidates locally and as part of the Ayr constituency in the Scottish Parliament. Heathfield in Ayr North also forms part of the constituency: this area is relatively small but has been more supportive of the SNP in recent council elections.

UK Parliament elections 
The seat has mostly elected Labour Party MPs since the 1950s, with the former MP Brian Donohoe having represented the seat since its creation in 2005, and was MP for the predecessor seat of Cunninghame South since the 1992 general election. He lost his seat at the 2015 general election during an SNP landslide in Scotland, in which the SNP's Philippa Whitford was elected with a majority of 13,589 votes. At the 2017 local election the Conservatives were well ahead in Prestwick and Troon in South Ayrshire, with the SNP finishing first in Irvine in North Ayrshire. Philippa Whitford returned as the Member of Parliament for the Central Ayrshire constituency at the 2017 general election with a significantly reduced majority of 1,267 votes (2.8%) ahead of Conservative challenger Caroline Hollins-Martin. At the 2019 UK election, Philippa Whitford was returned as Member of Parliament for the third time, increasing her majority to 5,304 votes (11.4%).

Scottish Parliament elections 
The constituency overlaps the Scottish Parliamentary constituencies of Ayr, Carrick, Cumnock and Doon Valley and Cunninghame South. The Member of the Scottish Parliament (MSP)  for the Ayr constituency since the 2021 election is Siobhian Brown of the SNP.  The seat was previously held by Conservative John Scott, who won a by-election in 2000.

Cunninghame South has been represented since the 2016 Scottish Parliament election by SNP MSP Ruth Maguire.

Council elections 
At the most recent local council election in 2017 the composition of Councillors elected in the equivalent area of the Central Ayrshire constituency was as follows:

The total number of votes cast by political party in the equivalent area of Central Ayrshire at the local election was as follows: 
 Scottish Conservatives - 11,657 (38.3%)
 Scottish National Party - 10,391 (34.2%)
 Scottish Labour - 7,151 (23.5%)
 Independents - 679 (2.2%)
 Scottish Greens - 536 (1.8%)
 Trade Unionist and Socialist Coalition - 42 (0.1%)

Members of Parliament

Elections

Elections in the 2010s

Elections in the 2000s

Elections in the 1970s

Elections in the 1960s

Elections in the 1950s

References

Westminster Parliamentary constituencies in Scotland
Constituencies of the Parliament of the United Kingdom established in 1950
Constituencies of the Parliament of the United Kingdom disestablished in 1983
Constituencies of the Parliament of the United Kingdom established in 2005
Politics of North Ayrshire
Politics of South Ayrshire
Irvine, North Ayrshire
Prestwick
Troon
Kilwinning